Alan David Hoffmann is an Israeli educator who served as the Director-General and CEO of the Jewish Agency for Israel from 2010-2018.

Early life
Hoffmann was born in 1946 in Johannesburg, South Africa to Dr. Samuel Hoffmann, an anesthetist, and Ida (Cohen). After his graduation from the University of Witwatersrand (1966) in political science and philosophy, he became the Education Director of his local Zionist Youth Movement, Habonim, followed by service as the movement's Secretary General and CEO.

Career 
With the outbreak of the Six-Day War, Hoffmann went to Israel to volunteer, leading to his Aliyah and service in the IDF (1968-1970) in the Nachal Paratroop Brigade. From 1971-73, Hoffmann attended Hebrew University in Law and Jewish philosophy, alongside teaching on Young Judea's Year Course through Hadassah. From 1973-76, he was the Director of the Year Course. Hoffmann was a graduate student at Harvard Graduate School of Education (1976–79).

In 1979, Hoffmann returned to Israel where he became Director of Evaluation of JDC Israel. In 1980 he was recruited by Professor Seymour Fox and Professor Michael Rosenak to the Melton Centre for Jewish Education in the Diaspora. He spent the next decade and a half at the Melton Center for Jewish Education of Hebrew University – serving as its Director from 1984-94.

In 1994, Hoffmann took a leave of absence from Hebrew University and was appointed Director of the Center for Initiatives in Jewish Education (CIJE) in New York, initiated and sponsored by Morton Mandel.

In 1996, Hoffmann returned to Israel to serve as the Director of the Mandel Center at the Hebrew University, where he co-founded the Revivim program at Hebrew University with Professor Yair Zakovitch. He joined the Jewish Agency for Israel (JAFI) in 2000.

For the next decade, he served as the Director General of the Department of Jewish Zionist Education at the Jewish Agency. In March 2010 he was appointed Director General and CEO of the Jewish Agency and was the first immigrant to hold this position. He retired at the end of 2018. When Hoffman retired, Natan Sharansky, famous refusenik and Jewish Agency Chairman, thanked him for his work and thanked Hoffmann because he, “helped lay solid foundations for the Jewish Agency of the future, connecting young Jews to Israel and young Israelis to the Jewish people, strengthening and increasing Aliya and supporting the vulnerable.”

While at the Jewish Agency, Hoffmann co-founded Masa Israel Journey with JAFI Chairman Sallai Meridor and Prime Minister Ariel Sharon in 2004, developed the Makom Israel Education Lab, and then co-founded the service year shlichim initiative (Shinshinim) in 2014.

Hoffmann wrote the chapter on "the role of the Jew in the contemporary world" in the book The Sovereign and the Situated Self: Jewish Identity and Community in the 21st Century.

Personal life 
Hoffmann lives in Jerusalem with his wife, Nadia and together they have four children.

References

Living people
Israeli educators
University of the Witwatersrand alumni
Harvard Graduate School of Education alumni
Israeli chief executives
Year of birth missing (living people)